Barry Fitzgerald (born 1 October 1938) is a former Australian rules footballer who played with Fitzroy in the VFL.

On 6 July 1963, he was 19th man for the young and inexperienced Fitzroy team that comprehensively and unexpectedly defeated Geelong, 9.13 (67) to 3.13 (31) in the 1963 Miracle Match.

See also
 1963 Miracle Match

External links

1938 births
Australian rules footballers from South Australia
Fitzroy Football Club players
Living people